Jimmy Crampton (born 23 July 1947) is a Burmese former middle distance runner who competed in the 1972 Summer Olympics.

References

External links
 

1949 births
Living people
Burmese male middle-distance runners
Olympic athletes of Myanmar
Athletes (track and field) at the 1972 Summer Olympics
Asian Games medalists in athletics (track and field)
Athletes (track and field) at the 1970 Asian Games
Asian Games gold medalists for Myanmar
Asian Games bronze medalists for Myanmar
Medalists at the 1970 Asian Games
Southeast Asian Games medalists in athletics
Southeast Asian Games gold medalists for Myanmar